The Kurdish Revolutionary Hezbollah was a splinter group of the Kurdish Hezbollah of Iran and Supreme Council for the Islamic Revolution in Iraq. The Kurdish Revolutionary Hezbollah established 1988 in South Kurdistan under the leadership of Adham Barzani, a cousin of Massoud Barzani. It was dissolved in 2004.

References

Kurdish Revolutionary Hizbollah at globalsecurity.org
 Iraqi Opposition at globalsecurity.org
The Middle East and North Africa. Routledge 2003, p. 515

Kurdish Islamic organisations
Kurdish Islamism
Political parties in Kurdistan Region
Kurdish political parties in Iraq